Miguel Bruno Pereira Herlein (born 11 February 1993) is a Portuguese footballer who plays as a forward.

Club career
Born in Amora (Seixal) of Argentinian descent, Herlein played youth football with S.L. Benfica. He started his senior career with Akritas Chlorakas in the Cypriot Second Division.

Herlein signed with Spanish club Granada CF in March 2013, being assigned to the reserves in the Tercera División. In the following transfer window, he was loaned to Vilaverdense F.C. in his country's third tier.

After a brief spell in the Indian Super League with FC Goa, Herlein joined the New York Cosmos in 2015, being the leading scorer for their B team as they won the National Premier Soccer League; highlights included four goals in a 7–0 home win against the Seacoast United Phantoms on 11 July. Subsequently, he played amateur football in Spain, Italy and Portugal.

International career
Herlein represented Portugal at under-16 and under-18 levels.

References

External links

1993 births
Living people
People from Seixal
Portuguese people of Argentine descent
Sportspeople from Setúbal District
Sportspeople of Argentine descent
Portuguese footballers
Association football forwards
Campeonato de Portugal (league) players
S.L. Benfica footballers
Vilaverdense F.C. players
Cypriot Second Division players
Akritas Chlorakas players
Tercera División players
Club Recreativo Granada players
Indian Super League players
FC Goa players
Serie D players
Portugal youth international footballers
Portuguese expatriate footballers
Expatriate footballers in Cyprus
Expatriate footballers in Spain
Expatriate footballers in India
Expatriate soccer players in the United States
Expatriate footballers in Italy
Portuguese expatriate sportspeople in Cyprus
Portuguese expatriate sportspeople in Spain
Portuguese expatriate sportspeople in India
Portuguese expatriate sportspeople in the United States
Portuguese expatriate sportspeople in Italy